Deutojapyx is a genus of diplurans in the family Japygidae.

Species
 Deutojapyx greeni (Silvestri, 1931)
 Deutojapyx guizhouensis Chou, in Chou & Chen 1983

References

Diplura